Dai may refer to:

Names
 Dai (given name), a Welsh or Japanese masculine given name
 Dai (surname) (戴), a Chinese surname

Places and regimes
 Dai Commandery, a commandery of the state of Zhao and in early imperial China
 Dai County, in Xinzhou, Shanxi, China
 Dai (Eighteen Kingdoms), a short-lived state during the Eighteen Kingdoms period in Chinese history
 Dai (Han dynasty), a realm and title during the Han dynasty
 Dai (Sixteen Kingdoms), a Xianbei-led dynastic state during the Sixteen Kingdoms era of Chinese history
 Dai (Spring and Autumn period), a state during the Spring and Autumn period in Chinese history
 Dai (Warring States period), a short-lived state during the Warring States period in Chinese history

People and language
 Da'i al-Mutlaq or Da'i, a type of religious leader in Islam
 Da'i, person engageing in Dawah, the act of inviting people to Islam
 Dai language (disambiguation)
 Dai people, an ethnic minority of China
 Dai (Yindu), or Daai Chin, an ethnic tribe of Chin, Myanmar

Other uses
 Dai (cryptocurrency), a cryptocurrency-backed stablecoin
 DAI Personal Computer, an early home computer from Belgium
 Daimler AG's stock symbol
 De Administrando Imperio, work written by the 10th-century Byzantine Emperor Constantine VII
 Deutsches Archäologisches Institut, or German Archaeological Institute, an archaeological institute operated by the German ministry of foreign affairs
 DAI Global, an international development firm
 Diamond Aircraft Industries, an aircraft manufacturer
 Diffuse axonal injury, a type of traumatic brain injury
 Digital Author Identifier, a unique number for an author in the Dutch research system
 Direct audio input, a port used in hearing aids and hearing instruments
 Distributed artificial intelligence, a subfield of artificial intelligence
 Do As Infinity, a Japanese band
 Dragon Age: Inquisition, a video game by BioWare
 Dynamic ARP Inspection, a security protocol